"Maybe He'll Notice Her Now" is a song written by Tim Johnson and recorded by American country music artist Mindy McCready featuring Richie McDonald. It was released in October 1996 as the third single from McCready's double-platinum selling album Ten Thousand Angels.  The song reached number 18 on the Billboard Hot Country Singles & Tracks chart.

Content
The song is a ballad about a woman who leaves in order to get her man's attention.

Critical reception
Deborah Evans Price, of Billboard magazine reviewed the song favorably, saying that McCready delivers the song with "warmth and conviction." She goes on to call the lyric "poignant" and states that the performance is "credible" and "beautifully complemented" by Richie McDonald.

Music video
The music video was directed by Jim Hershleder and premiered in October 1996.

Chart performance
"Maybe He'll Notice Her Now" debuted at number 67 on the U.S. Billboard Hot Country Singles & Tracks for the week of October 12, 1996.

References

1996 singles
1996 songs
Mindy McCready songs
Richie McDonald songs
Male–female vocal duets
Song recordings produced by David Malloy
Songs written by Tim Johnson (songwriter)
BNA Records singles
1990s ballads